Blanc Magazine is an independently published magazine founded in 2011 covering fashion, art, and music.

Its owner and editor-in-chief is Teneshia Carr, a fashion photographer and writer at Inc.com with headquarters in New York. Teneshia Carr supports black owned businesses.

The magazine is available on line and has 4 yearly print issues.

Their motto is to "provide a diverse and often underrepresented perspective of Fashion, art, and music", "by showcasing a variety of talent, both established and undiscovered from various countries around the world."

References 

Fashion magazines
Music magazines